The black butcherbird (Melloria quoyi, also known as Cracticus quoyi) is a species of butcherbird in the family Artamidae.
It is found in Australia, Indonesia, and Papua New Guinea.
Its natural habitats are subtropical or tropical dry forest, subtropical or tropical moist lowland forest, and subtropical or tropical mangrove forest.

Taxonomy

Evidence was published in a 2013 molecular study which showed that it was the sister taxon to the Australian magpie (Gymnorhina tibicen). The ancestor to the two species is thought to have split from the other butcherbirds between 8.3 and 4.2 million years ago, during the late Miocene to early Pliocene, while the two species themselves diverged sometime during the Pliocene (5.8–3.0 million years ago).

Description 
The adult is black all over except for its beak which is black-tipped grey. The juvenile is rufous-brown. As the only butcherbirds with wholly black bodies, they are sometimes confused with crows or currawongs, from which they are distinguished by their gray and hooked bills.

Behavior
In Papua New Guinea, Black butcherbirds have been observed parasitizing the nests of Hooded monarch birds.

In 1903, ornithologist E. M. Cornwall observed brown and black varieties of the bird, the black preferring deeper forest and the brown preferring coastal scrub or mangroves.

References

External Links

black butcherbird
Birds of New Guinea
Birds of the Northern Territory
Birds of Queensland
black butcherbird
black butcherbird
Taxonomy articles created by Polbot